Sovereign Dancer (January 24, 1975 – December 25, 1993) was an American Thoroughbred racehorse best known as a sire of two American Classic Race winners.

Background
Bred by Ogden Mills Phipps, he was a son of the most important sire of the 20th Century, Northern Dancer and from the mare Bold Princess, a daughter of the eight-time Leading sire in North America, Bold Ruler.

Racing career
At age four Sovereign Dancer was sold to Alec Head's Haras du Quesnay near Deauville in the Lower Normandy region of France where he compiled a record of two wins, three seconds, and a third in ten starts on grass for trainer Criquette Head-Maarek. Sovereign Dancer won his debut in France in April 1979 at Maisons-Laffitte Racecourse and won in his fourth start at the Evry Racecourse. His best result in a Conditions race was a second in the Group 3 Grand Prix de Vichy.

Stud record
Retired from racing after the 1979 season, Sovereign Dancer returned to stand at stud in the United States. A successful sire, some of his important sons include:
 Gate Dancer (b. 1981), won 1984 Preakness Stakes
 Itsallgreektome (b. 1987), the 1990 American Champion Male Turf Horse
 Priolo (b. 1987), winner of three Group One races in France
 Louis Quatorze (b. 1993), equalled race record time in winning the 1996 Preakness Stakes
 Double Orphan (b. 1994), 2000 Champion Older Male Horse in Puerto Rico
 Moment of Glory (b. 1994), Champion Stayer in India

Damsire:
 Disturbingthepeace (b. 1998), multiple stakes winner

External links
 Sovereign Dancer: Stallion Dynasties

References
 Sovereign Dancer's pedigree and partial racing stats
Bowen, Edward L. Legacies of the Turf (2003) Eclipse Press 

1975 racehorse births
1993 racehorse deaths
Racehorses bred in Kentucky
Racehorses trained in the United States
Racehorses trained in France
Thoroughbred family 5-f